Besan barfi (barfee) or Besan ki barfi or Besan Chakki (Hindi: बेसन की बर्फ़ी/बेसन चक्की is a common barfi sweet from the Indian subcontinent. It is made with besan (gram flour), condensed milk, and sugar.

Preparation 
The sugar blends into a creamy texture that comes from the basic mixture, khoya. The mix is generally heated until the milk solidifies and is then placed in molds of different shapes—diamond, square or sometimes round.

It is usually garnished with sliced or chopped almonds or pistachios. It is sometimes called "Indian cheesecake", though it contains no cheese. Variations of the dish include apricot, mango and coconut flavorings.

The presence of Besan provides very smooth texture, thus makes Khoya an optional ingredient.

References

Indian desserts
Indian confectionery